Devine is a surname. It may also refer to:

 Devine, Colorado, an unincorporated community
 Devine, Texas, United States, a city
 Devine High School
 Devine, British Columbia, Canada, a rural community
 3561 Devine, asteroid